NGO 2.0 project is designed to enhance the digital and social media literacy of grassroots NGOs in the underdeveloped regions of China. The Project was launched by Prof Jing Wang, in collaboration with the University of Science and Technology of China, NGO Communication Net, Friends of Nature, Sun Yat-sen University, and Ogilvy & Mather Beijing and Shanghai. In 2011, Tsinghua University's Future Media Center joined the partnership. Secondary partners include Naranda Foundation, MilwardBrown, and CreditEase Co. (2010-2011).

The project is volunteer based. It delivers an open mapping platform and an open NGO community complete with Creative Commons licensed Web 2.0 training courses and a Chinese software guide to the best tools and best practices for nonprofits.

Three Major Components
 Web 2.0 training workshops
The workshop has a two-fold task: first, to train those grassroots that already had websites to start using Web 2.0 tools and to rethink their digital communication strategy; secondly, to convince those that don’t have websites that they can bypass   the labor-intensive and expensive 1.0 architecture to leapfrog into Web 2.0 practices.

Those NGOs straddle across six issue areas: environment, health, women & children, community development/poverty alleviation, education, information NGOs.

 An open mapping platform (www.ngo20map.com)
The map is crowdsourced. It is built to connect the corporate CSR programs and the nonprofit sector. The grassroots NGOs use this map to post their project and organizational needs. At the same time, the platform displays resources made available by CSR programs (resources such as opportunities for project collaboration, funds, give-away equipments, organized corporate volunteer help).

 An NGO ranking system 
To assess the organizational transparency and communication capability of grassroots NGOs. This system will allow potential corporate donors to better leverage the Web/Web 2.0 as a means of enhancing their social responsibility programs.

 Hackathons and Technology Salons (Tech4Good)
NGO2.0 holds Tech4Good activities in Guangzhou in collaboration with TechSoup Global, Google Developers' Community in Guangzhou, and the School of Software at Sun Yat-sen University.  The goal of these activities is to help Guangzhou based NGOs to develop prototypes of tools that will facilitate their nonprofit work.

References

External links
 NGO 2.0 Project in China 
 KunMing Workshop 
 Google Mapping of NGO2.0 China 
 Wikimedia Foundation Appoints Jing Wang and Mimi Ito to its Advisory Board 

Non-profit organizations based in China
Non-governmental organizations